The Moosewood Cookbook (1977) is a vegetarian cookbook by Mollie Katzen that was published by Ten Speed Press.
It is a revised version of a 1974 self-published cookbook by members of the Moosewood Restaurant in Ithaca, New York.

History

Self-published original
In 1974, members of the original Moosewood Restaurant self- published a spiral bound paper-covered vegetarian cookbook, with "The Moosewood Cookbook Recipes from Moosewood Restaurant in the Dewitt Mall, Ithaca, New York" on the title page. Page three contains a list of its creators: "Design, Editing, Hand-writing, Pen-and-ink illustrations Mollie Katzen Feedback digestion, Critical Analysis, Introduction & History Nancy McCauley Cover Drawing Judith M. Barringer Onion Photogram Kathy Morris Frontispiece: charcoal drawing Meredith (Mimi) Barchat Photographs Phyllis Boudreau Photographic Montage Phyllis Boudreau Susan B. Lent." In addition, the Postward on page 79 states: "we have only presented our original recipes in this book," and offers a list of their "favorite cookbooks" that served as "our sources of inspiration." The list includes: Diet for a Small Planet, Recipes for a Small Planet, The Yogi Cookbook (Yogi Vithaldas and Susan Roberts), Ten Talents, The Vegetarian Epicure, Sunset Mexican Cookbook, and The Joy of Cooking.

Mainstream publication
In 1977, Ten Speed Press in California published a revised version of the 1974 self-published original, with "The Moosewood Cookbook Recipes from Moosewood Restaurant Ithaca, New York Compiled, Edited, Illustrated and Hand-Lettered by Mollie Katzen" on the title page. Page five lists additional contributors: "Frontspiece: Charcoal Drawing by Meridith Barchat Photographs by J.M. Barringer Cover Design by Meridith Barchat and Mollie Katzen." This page also contains a list of 37 names (including Katzen) introduced as: "The Moosewood People who have created the Moosewood Restaurant in Ithaca, New York from which this book has sprung."

The Moosewood Cookbook became a highly influential vegetarian cookbook, with four editions (1977, 1992, 2000, 2014).

Reception
In 2018, New York Magazine named it to their list of best vegan and vegetarian cookbooks, saying "no chef cooking vegetables can afford not to read (it)."

In 2007, it won the Cookbook Hall of Fame, James Beard Foundation Awards.

Bibliography
 (self-published)

References

External links

1977 non-fiction books
American cookbooks
Vegetarian cookbooks
Ten Speed Press books
Vegetarianism in the United States